The Archdiocese of Pelotas is a Roman Catholic archdiocese located in the city of Pelotas, Rio Grande do Sul. Before being elevated to an archdiocese in its own right on April 13, 2011, it was part of the ecclesiastical province of Porto Alegre in Brazil.

History
 15 August 1910: Established as Diocese of Pelotas from the Diocese of São Pedro do Rio Grande
 13 April 2011: Elevated to archdiocese

Bishops
 Bishops of Pelotas (Roman rite)
Francisco de Campos Barreto † (12 May 1911 - 30 July 1920) Appointed, Bishop of Campinas
Joaquim Ferreira de Mello † (15 March 1921 - 22 September 1940) Died
Antônio Zattera † (31 January 1942 - 1 September 1977) Resigned
Jayme Henrique Chemello (1 September 1977 - 1 July 2009) Resigned
Jacinto Bergmann (1 July 2009 - 13 April 2011) Appointed archbishop
Archbishops of Pelotas (Roman rite)
Jacinto Bergmann (13 April 2011 – present)

Auxiliary bishops
Angelo Félix Mugnol (1966-1969), appointed Bishop of Bagé, Rio Grande do Sul
Jayme Henrique Chemello (1969-1977), appointed Bishop here
Jacinto Bergmann (2002-2004), appointed Bishop of Tubarão, Santa Catarina (later returned here as Bishop)

Other priest of this diocese who became bishop
≠Carlos Rômulo Gonçalves e Silva, appointed Coadjutor Bishop of Montenegro in 2017

Suffragan Sees 
 Diocese of Bagé
 Diocese of Rio Grande

References
 GCatholic.org
 Catholic Hierarchy
 Diocese website (Portuguese)

Roman Catholic dioceses in Brazil
Christian organizations established in 1910
Roman Catholic ecclesiastical provinces in Brazil
 
Roman Catholic dioceses and prelatures established in the 20th century